Frederick II of Hesse-Homburg, also known as the Prince of Homburg (30 March 1633 – 24 January 1708) was Landgrave of Hesse-Homburg. He was also a successful and experienced general for the crowns of both Sweden and of Brandenburg, but is best remembered as the eponymous hero of Heinrich von Kleist's play Der Prinz von Homburg.

Life

Childhood and youth 
Frederick was born in Homburg (the present Bad Homburg vor der Höhe), the seventh and youngest child of Landgrave Frederick I of Hesse-Homburg, who died in 1638, leaving the children to be brought up under the care of their mother, Margaret Elisabeth of Leiningen-Westerburg.

At his mother's wish Frederick was educated by private tutors together with the sons of his cousin, George II, Landgrave of Hesse-Darmstadt, in Marburg. In 1648 he broke his leg and spent some time convalescing in Bad Pfäfers.

When Field-Marshal Henri de la Tour d'Auvergne, Vicomte de Turenne, appeared in the vicinity, Frederick was sent by his mother to conduct negotiations for the safety of Homburg. Turenne found the prince so engaging that he wanted to take him straight away into his army and to pay for his military education. Frederick's mother however opposed the idea, and it came to nothing.

At the age of 16 he made the Grand Tour through Italy and France, and was then signed up as a student at the University of Geneva, although he did not follow a real course of academic study: he learned dancing, riding and fencing, and polished his knowledge of the French language.

Military career 
Since his elder brothers preceded him in the succession, he decided on a military career and in 1654 became a colonel in the army of the King of Sweden, Charles X Gustav.

In 1659 during the storming of Copenhagen during the Northern Wars Frederick was so seriously wounded that his lower right leg had to be amputated. He was promoted to major-general (Generalmajor) and from then on had a wooden leg. Frederick was chosen by Charles X as the Statthalter of Livonia, but after the king's death things changed considerably, and Frederick left Swedish service in 1661.

In the same year he married Margareta Brahe, a wealthy Swedish widow, who died in 1669. With her wealth he bought estates in Brandenburg and became a friend of the Elector Friedrich Wilhelm I of Brandenburg. In 1670 Frederick married the Elector's niece Princess Luise Elisabeth von Kurland, after moving from the Lutheran to the Reformed church and entering the service of Brandenburg as a general. In 1672 he received the command of all the forces of Brandenburg.

In 1672 and 1674 he fought in the Dutch War, among other places in Alsace against the French army commanded by Turenne. As commander of the Brandenburg cavalry, during the Swedish invasion, on 28 June 1675 in the Battle of Fehrbellin he attacked the Swedish army without orders to do so, causing them heavy losses. In the event this move contributed decisively to the victory of Brandenburg but also to the displeasure of the Elector. In the years 1676-1678 he took part in the campaigns in Pomerania and Prussia and negotiated on behalf of the Elector of Brandenburg the Treaty of Saint-Germain of 1679.

Landgrave of Hesse-Homburg 
After leaving military service he lived as a Junker in Brandenburg. After the death of Georg Christian, his second eldest brother, who had mortgaged to Hesse-Darmstadt the landgraviate of Hesse-Homburg and the town of Homburg, Frederick redeemed them, and took up residence there himself. In 1681, after the death of his brother Landgrave Wilhelm Christoph of Hesse-Homburg, Frederick took over the governance of the territory as Frederick II. He was however forced to return the territory of Bingenheim, which Wilhelm Christoph had occupied, to Hesse-Darmstadt, in exchange for financial compensation.

He had the Baroque Schloss Bad Homburg constructed, and involved himself, with little success, in the local economy with the establishment of a glassworks and a salination plant. More successful was the settlement of Huguenot and Waldensian refugees from France, in Friedrichsdorf and Dornholzhausen. His court alchemist, Paul Andrich, made him a prosthetic leg with springs and silver mounts - whence his nickname "the Landgrave with the silver leg".

In 1690 his wife died, having borne him 12 children. At the age of 59 Frederick married for a third time: the widow Sophie Sybille von Leiningen-Westerburg, a connection of his mother's family, who bore him three more children.

Frederick died in 1708 in Homburg, apparently from pneumonia, after a last journey to Leipzig to meet Charles XII, King of Sweden.

Children 
Frederick II was married three times: in 1661 to Countess Margarethe Brahe (1603–1669); in 1670 to Princess Louise Elisabeth of Courland (1646–1690); and in 1691 to Countess Sophie Sybille of Leiningen-Westerburg (1656–1724).

Children by Margarethe Brahe: none

Children by Louise Elisabeth of Courland:
 Charlotte Dorothea Sophia (1672–1738)
married 1694 Johann Ernst III, Duke of Saxe-Weimar (1664–1707)
 Frederick III Jacob (1673–1746), Landgrave of Hesse-Homburg
married 1. 1700 Princess Elisabeth Dorothea of Hesse-Darmstadt (1676–1721)
married 2. 1728 Princess Christiane Charlotte of Nassau-Ottweiler (1685–1761)
 Karl Christian (1674–1695), fell at the Siege of Namur
 Hedwig Luise (1675–1760)
married 1718 Count Adam Friedrich von Schlieben (1677–1752)
 Philipp (1676–1706), fell at the Battle of Speyerbach in the War of the Spanish Succession
 Wilhelmine Maria (1678–1770)
married 1711 Count Anton II of Aldenburg (1681–1738)
 Eleonore Margarete (1679–1763) Deaness in Reformed Monastery of Herford
 Elisabeth Juliana Francisca (1681–1707)
married 1702 Prince Frederick William Adolf, Prince of Nassau-Siegen (1680–1722)
 Johanna Ernestine (1682–1698)
 Ferdinand (born and died 1683)
 Karl Ferdinand (1684–1688)
 Casimir William (1690–1726)
married 1722 Countess Christine Charlotte of Solms-Braunfels (1690–1751)

Children by Sophie Sybille of Leiningen-Westerburg:
 Ludwig Georg (1693–1728)
married 1710 Countess Christine of Limpurg-Sontheim (1683–1746)
 Friederike Sophie (1693–1694)
 Leopold (born and died 1695)

Literary references 

Frederick is the eponymous hero of the well-known German drama Prinz Friedrich von Homburg (in full, Prinz Friedrich von Homburg oder die Schlacht bei Fehrbellin) by Heinrich von Kleist (written 1809–1810, first published 1821). The character of the prince in the play however has little apart from the name in common with the historical personage.

The drama in its turn has inspired an opera, Der Prinz von Homburg, by Hans Werner Henze (written 1958, performed 1960) and a number of films, including Marco Bellochio's Il Principe di Homburg, released in 1997.

Notes

References 
 
 
 Rosendorfer, Herbert, 1991: Der Prinz von Homburg: Biographie. München: Dtv 
 Gräf, Holger T: Der Held von Fehrbellin, in Die Zeit, 3/2008 of 10 Jan. 2008, p. 72
 Gräf, Holger T, 2008: Landgraf Friedrich II., der Prinz von Homburg. Sutton

External links 
 
 Account of the Battle of Fehrbellin (preussenweb.de after Frank Bauer, Fehrbellin 1675) 

Frederick 02
1633 births
1708 deaths
Swedish generals
German people of the Thirty Years' War
Deaths from pneumonia in Germany
German amputees